Mulona is a genus of moths in the subfamily Arctiinae. The genus was erected by Francis Walker in 1866.

Species
Mulona barnesi Field, 1952
Mulona grisea Hampson, 1900
Mulona lapidaria Walker, 1866
Mulona manni Field, 1952
Mulona phelina (Druce, 1885)
Mulona piperita Reich, 1933
Mulona schausi Field, 1952

References

Lithosiini
Moth genera